Deva is a parish of the municipality of Gijón, in Asturias, Spain. The toponym itself comes from an ancient pre-Roman/astur deity.

Its population was 705 in 2012.

Points of interest
Deva is a residential and rural area which borders the municipality of Villaviciosa in the east, and with the districts of Cabueñes in the north and Caldones in the south.  The area is mainly made up of fields (occupied mainly by cows), belonging to adjacent farmhouses. There are also many chalets and houses, and a horseriding center. A small river passes through the area and it is common for cityfolk to come to Deva at the weekends to enjoy the fresh air and the many bars and "merenderos".

The highest peak is Monte Deva (423 m). There is a small natural park surrounding the peak, where roe deer, wild boar and many species of bird can be found. There is also an astronomical observatory, and great views of the city of Gijon.

Holidays
The parish of Deva celebrates a traditional Fiesta every year in honour of their patron saint, San Salvador. Deva's vibrant community spirit is highlighted during these festivities, where elders and youths mingle, eating lamb and drinking cider.

Villages and their neighbourhoods
Castañera
El Fondón
Llorea
La Olla
L'Arquera
Chelufausto
El Mirador
La Parea los Teyeros
El Pedroco
La Reguera
La Posadiella
La Quinta'l Conde
Riosecu
Brañaverniz
San Antonio
L'Armería
Serantes
Zarracina

Notes

External links
 Official Toponyms - Principality of Asturias website.
 Official Toponyms: Laws - BOPA Nº 229 - Martes, 3 de octubre de 2006 & DECRETO 105/2006, de 20 de septiembre, por el que se determinan los topónimos oficiales del concejo de Gijón.

Parishes in Gijón